Joaquim Machado Gonçalves (born 10 October 1966), known as Quim Machado, is a Portuguese former footballer who played as a right back, and is a current manager of Saudi club Al-Orobah.

In his playing days, he achieved Primeira Liga totals of 255 games in the 1990s, in representation of six clubs. He began work as a manager in the following decade, leading three teams in the top tier.

Playing career
Born in Santo Tirso, Porto District, Machado began his senior career with local F.C. Tirsense in 1985, competing in the Segunda Liga with the club. Subsequently, over one decade and always in the Primeira Liga, he represented S.C. Braga, Vitória de Guimarães, C.F. Estrela da Amadora, G.D. Chaves, Varzim S.C. and S.C. Campomaiorense; with the second team, he appeared in four complete games in the 1992–93 UEFA Cup, helping dispose of Real Sociedad in the first round (3–2 on aggregate).

Machado returned to the second division for his last seasons, playing for F.C. Maia and C.D. Aves. He also spent one year in lower league football with first team Tirsense, before retiring altogether at nearly 37 with F91 Dudelange in Luxembourg.

Coaching career
Machado began his coaching career in 2004, with amateurs AD Oliveirense. He moved to Tirsense also in division four two years later, promoting to the third tier at the first attempt and going on to achieve a further three top-four finishes.

Machado signed with second division club C.D. Feirense in June 2010, winning promotion at the end of his first season and returning the Azuis da Feira to the top flight after 23 years. He was relieved of his duties on 2 April 2012 due to poor results, and the team was ultimately relegated as second from bottom. In July, he was appointed at Hungary's Vasas SC, only to return to his previous job after a mere two months.

In October 2013, Machado signed for Chaves in the same league. On 16 June of the following year, he was appointed at Ekstraklasa club Lechia Gdańsk, leaving in September due to poor results.

In the 2014–15 campaign, Machado led C.D. Tondela to the second-tier championship, with the subsequent first-ever promotion to the top flight. On 18 May 2016, after having narrowly avoided relegation from the latter competition with Vitória de Setúbal, he resigned.

On 24 September 2016, Machado was appointed at second division's C.D. Santa Clara after Daniel Ramos moved to C.S. Marítimo. After only two games, he left for family reasons and signed for C.F. Os Belenenses of the top tier on 6 October. He left the Estádio do Restelo the following 17 April, in disagreement with a proposed new contract that would limit his influence over the club's transfer business.

Machado then went back abroad with Al Batin FC in the Saudi Professional League, who sacked him in February 2018 when they were in 19th place. He returned to his country's second division on 2 April, taking the helm at Associação Académica de Coimbra after Ricardo Soares's departure. He won four of his seven matches in charge, and resumed his career on 27 September that year at last-placed F.C. Arouca.

Having left Arouca after their May 2019 relegation, Machado was linked to South Korea's K League 1, but nothing came of it. A year later, he returned to work in his country's second division with U.D. Vilafranquense. He lost his job on 26 October 2020, with the team second-bottom after seven games.

On 6 June 2022, Machado returned to Saudi Arabia to manage First Division side Al-Orobah.

Managerial statistics

References

External links

1966 births
Living people
People from Santo Tirso
Portuguese footballers
Association football defenders
Primeira Liga players
Liga Portugal 2 players
F.C. Tirsense players
S.C. Braga players
Vitória S.C. players
C.F. Estrela da Amadora players
G.D. Chaves players
Varzim S.C. players
S.C. Campomaiorense players
F.C. Maia players
C.D. Aves players
Luxembourg National Division players
F91 Dudelange players
Portuguese expatriate footballers
Expatriate footballers in Luxembourg
Portuguese expatriate sportspeople in Luxembourg
Portuguese football managers
Primeira Liga managers
Liga Portugal 2 managers
C.D. Feirense managers
G.D. Chaves managers
C.D. Tondela managers
Vitória F.C. managers
C.D. Santa Clara managers
C.F. Os Belenenses managers
Associação Académica de Coimbra – O.A.F. managers
Nemzeti Bajnokság I managers
Vasas SC managers
Lechia Gdańsk managers
Saudi Professional League managers
Al Batin FC managers
Saudi First Division League managers
Portuguese expatriate football managers
Expatriate football managers in Hungary
Expatriate football managers in Poland
Expatriate football managers in Saudi Arabia
Portuguese expatriate sportspeople in Hungary
Portuguese expatriate sportspeople in Poland
Portuguese expatriate sportspeople in Saudi Arabia
Sportspeople from Porto District